Northwich railway station serves the town of Northwich in Cheshire, England.

History
The CMR was one of the constituent routes of the Cheshire Lines Committee (CLC) from its formation, and the WCR was built by the CLC. The original CMR terminus station in Northwich was likely the building that became the goods station but was replaced early, in 1869, as the continuing line towards Hartford was being constructed as part of the West Cheshire Railway (WCR).

Further lines to  via Middlewich (opened in November 1867 by the London and North Western Railway), Helsby (the West Cheshire Railway, opened in 1869) and a short goods branch to Winnington (also opened in 1869) would complete the network of routes serving the area, with  being served from May 1875. As a result, Northwich station was served by no fewer than four different pre-grouping railway companies. The LNWR also operated a number of its Sandbach & Crewe trains forward from here to  via Greenbank and the curve down to the West Coast Main Line at Hartford Junction.

The station expanded as the railway grew and by 1910 there were three platform faces, a bay for loading cattle, extensive goods sidings with a five-ton crane and a goods station. The CMR built a two-lane engine shed and turntable in 1869, the shed was doubled in size in 1877 and rebuilt around 1948 before closing to steam engines in 1968 and diesel in 1982.

Additional destinations were gradually added as they became available including Chester, Liverpool Central, Manchester Central, Sheffield and London Kings Cross.

Following the 1923 Grouping, Northwich remained a joint station (the CLC being jointly vested in the LNER & LMS and the LMS taking over the Sandbach branch trains).  Services to Acton Bridge ended during World War 2, but the primary routes to Chester, Crewe & Manchester continued in use up to and after nationalisation in January 1948 (when they became part of the London Midland Region of British Railways).  B.R withdrew passenger services from the Sandbach line and closed  station on 4 January 1960 - thereafter the outer face of the southern island platform at the station fell out of use, though the branch itself has continued in use for freight traffic and periodic passenger diversions.  Services on the main Manchester to Chester route would continue, but from 1969 both terminals for this service would change following the closure of Manchester Central station on 5 May and Chester Northgate on 6 October that year.  Trains henceforth ran to  eastbound and to the former GWR & LNWR Joint station at Chester General westbound.  Since 1990 though, Manchester-bound trains have been diverted beyond Altrincham to  run via Northenden & Stockport to reach Manchester Piccadilly as the former route via Sale is now part of the Metrolink tram network.

As of the December 2008 timetable, there were two additional weekday peak services to and from Stockport. On Sundays, a two-hourly service to Chester and Manchester was introduced, with the latter continuing to Southport, via Wigan Wallgate and Bolton.
Prior to the new service, trains to Manchester had not operated on Sundays since the early 1990s. Passengers had to change at Altrincham on to the Manchester Metrolink to continue their journeys. 

Services beyond Manchester were terminated in the May 2010 timetable change, with all current trains now terminating at Manchester Piccadilly. Additional weekday peak services to/from Stockport were suspended in 2020.

On 18 May 2021 a wall and part of the station roof collapsed onto the platform and track causing disruption but no injuries. The cause was not immediately known. Part of the collapsed building was subsequently demolished and the station reopened two days later.

Facilities
The main buildings on the Manchester-bound platform are still in use, with the ticket office open six days per week from early morning until early afternoon (Monday-Friday 06:15-13:30, Saturdays 07:15-14:30).  Two self-service ticket machines are also provided for use outside these times and for collecting advance purchase tickets.  The remaining parts of the building are used as a cafe and community centre.  A waiting shelter is provided on the Chester-bound side (platform 2), whilst train running details are offered via CIS displays and timetable posters. Step-free access is only possible from the main entrance to platform 1, as platform 2 access is via a stepped footbridge.

Services
The station gets one train per hour westbound to Chester and one train per hour eastbound to Manchester Piccadilly. 18 trains per day run to Chester, with 17 running towards Manchester. On Sundays, there is a two-hourly service each way, with 7 trains in each direction. The majority of services are run by Northern Trains Class 150 trains, with some Class 156's also serving the station.

There have been repeated plans for a half-hourly service in each direction - it was a part of the 2015 franchise agreement - though this has been repeatedly delayed due to capacity constraints between Stockport and Manchester and is yet to be implemented.

Proposed future developments
As part of Northern's proposed December 2022 timetable (which focuses on additional services within the Manchester area), an additional 4 trains per day between Chester and Stockport (2 in each direction) have been proposed during peak hours on Mondays to Saturdays. These services are aimed at those who are commuting to and/or working in Manchester and Stockport. This change will increase the number of trains departing Chester on the line to 20 per day, with the number departing Stockport also increased to 20 per day. The 2 hourly Sunday service will remain the same, at 7 trains per day. 

The Northern Hub proposes an additional hourly service to run between Greenbank and Stockport.

Re-instating the passenger service between Northwich and Sandbach has been proposed. This would allow direct trains to Crewe from Knutsford, giving a better connection to the Midlands and the South of England.

Proposals for a direct link to Manchester Airport from Northwich were first put forward in the 1990s, not much had seemed to materialise from this.  However, in 2009 Network Rail stated that the creation of the third platform has meant that the capacity at Manchester airport will become constrained by the layover of the trains and congestion at the throat.  To solve this issue they have recommended building a line underneath the Airport towards Northwich in the 2019 to 2024 period.

The running of tram-trains directly in to Manchester, in addition to the existing rail service, has been estimated as being able to cut about 10 minutes off the overall journey time to and from Manchester. Network Rail and the Department for Transport (DfT) have indicated that they are keen to carry out a trial for tram-trains in the UK, which will be between Rotherham and Sheffield.  Carrying out the trial would provide the information Network Rail and the DfT require on reliability, frequency and costs.

References

External links

  Mid-Cheshire Community Rail Partnership

Railway Station
Railway stations in Cheshire
DfT Category E stations
Railway stations in Great Britain opened in 1863
Former Cheshire Lines Committee stations
Northern franchise railway stations